Dave Christiano (born October 2, 1956) is a Christian filmmaker and twin brother of Rich Christiano. He owns Dave Christiano Films and ChristianFilms.com. Several of Christiano's films have been released to theaters.

In 2004, Christiano began producing 7th Street Theater, which was to be the first ever primetime Christian dramatic TV series. After shooting the first 24 episodes for the first season, it premiered on 3 March 2007 on the Trinity Broadcasting Network. The series now airs on several Christian Networks.

Filmography

References

External links 
 ChristianFilms.com – Official website
 7th Street Theater
 

American Christians
1956 births
Living people
American film directors